The Medal of Military Merit, is a military decoration of Uruguay. The decoration is awarded by the President of Uruguay. This award replaces the Order of Military Merit of the Companions of Artigas which was discontinued in 1985.

Background
The Medal of Military Merit was established on 28 November 1991 by Ministry of National Defense Decree N° 199/991. The regulations of the medal were further modified on 29 January 1992 by Decree N° 511/991. The Medal of Military merit is the highest military decoration of the Army of Uruguay.

Classes
The medal is awarded with or without swords in three different classes:
 First class is awarded to General officers and their civilian equivalents
 Second class is awarded to senior officers and their civilian equivalents
 Third class is awarded to officers and commanders and their civilian equivalents

References

External links
 Pictures at 

Military decorations and medals of Uruguay
1991 establishments in Uruguay
Awards established in 1991
National Army (Uruguay)